Hyver Hall is a grade II listed house in Barnet Road, to the west of Barnet Gate and Arkley, in the London Borough of Barnet.

It was purchased by Harpinder Singh Narula in 1991.

References

External links 

Grade II listed houses in London
Grade II listed buildings in the London Borough of Barnet
Arkley